The Mitsubishi 3B2 engine is a family of all-alloy three cylinder engines developed by Mitsubishi Motors, first produced in December 2005 at the company's Mizushima powertrain facility in Kurashiki, Okayama, for introduction in their 2006 Mitsubishi i kei car. All engines developed within this family have aluminum cylinder block and head, double overhead camshafts, four valves per cylinder, and MIVEC continuous variable valve timing.

The 3B20 was designed with the "rear midship" layout in mind but is not limited to that. The basic dimensions chosen reduced the powerplant's height, the cylinder block's structure was simplified, a timing chain was adopted, modularized components were used for the oil and water pumps, engine mounts, and fuel system. The aluminum construction and lightweight parts and materials in the manifolds helped reduce the weight of the engine by 20 percent compared with its iron-block 3G83 predecessor, while gains were also seen in torque, fuel economy and emissions. Bore pitch is 80 mm.

The preliminary version of the  engine was first seen in the "i" Concept test car introduced in 2003, and used Mitsubishi's Smart Idling system which turns off the engine automatically when the vehicle is stationary, and can restart it within 0.2 seconds.

The larger  capacity of the development engine was outside the limits of the kei class in Japan and was introduced in the second generation of the smart fortwo.

Specifications

3B20 

Applications:
 2006 - 2013 Mitsubishi i
 2013 - 2019 Mitsubishi eK 
 2013 - 2019 Nissan Dayz
 2014 - 2020 Mitsubishi eK Space 
 2014 - 2020 Nissan Dayz Roox

3B20T 

Applications:
 2006 - 2013 Mitsubishi i
 2013 - 2019 Mitsubishi eK 
 2013 - 2019 Nissan Dayz
 2014 - 2020 Mitsubishi eK Space 
 2014 - 2020 Nissan Dayz Roox

3B21 
This engine is also known as Mercedes-Benz M132 E10

Applications:
 2007 - 2014 Smart Fortwo

3B21T 
This engine is also known as Mercedes-Benz M132 E10 AL

Applications:
 2007 - 2014 Smart Fortwo

See also 
 List of Mitsubishi engines

References 

3B2
Straight-three engines
Gasoline engines by model